Gongrosargus is a genus of flies in the family Stratiomyidae.

Species
Gongrosargus distinguendus Lindner, 1966
Gongrosargus exclamationis Lindner, 1968
Gongrosargus flavipennis (Macquart, 1838)
Gongrosargus lateritius (Lindner, 1968)
Gongrosargus maculipennis (Lindner, 1936)
Gongrosargus niveitarsalis Lindner, 1966
Gongrosargus pallidus (Macquart, 1838)
Gongrosargus pauliani Lindner, 1966
Gongrosargus stuckenbergi Lindner, 1959
Gongrosargus superpictus Lindner, 1966
Gongrosargus viridenotatus Lindner, 1966

References

Stratiomyidae
Brachycera genera
Taxa named by Erwin Lindner
Diptera of Africa